Lichanura, the rosy boas, are a genus of snakes in the family Boidae. They are distributed across the southwestern United States and northwestern Mexico.

Species
There are two recognized species:

References

Boidae
Snake genera
Snakes of North America
Taxa named by Edward Drinker Cope